The Wearing of the Grin is a 1951 Warner Bros. Looney Tunes cartoon directed by Chuck Jones and written by Michael Maltese. The short was released on July 14, 1951, and stars Porky Pig.

Plot
On a raining stormy night while traveling through rural Ireland on his way to Dublin, Porky Pig is caught in a storm and asks for lodgings at a nearby castle for the night, but the caretaker, Seamus O'Toole, tells him that no one inhabits the place but himself and the leprechauns. Porky dismisses the remark, tells the caretaker to "cut out this nonsense and take my bags to a room", and slams the front door, causing a mace above to fall. It strikes Porky on the head and knocks him unconscious. At that point, "O'Toole" is revealed to be a pair of leprechauns disguised as a human being. O'Pat, the first one, is very calm while O'Mike, the second one, quickly becomes frantic with fear that Porky is after their pot of gold. O'Pat, being the "Chief Leprechaun" in their area, convinces his partner that he knows how to deal with the pig.

When Porky wakes up, he is helped to a room by the "reunited" caretaker who, during the short trip to the room, gets accidentally divided in two again when O'Pat walks along the stone railing of the stairs and goes off to the left as Porky and O'Mike go right. Porky, quite tired out by "all this excitement" doesn't notice the problem with his host, even handing him his coat, which O'Mike takes, and Porky tells him to just put the bags anywhere. Moving toward the bed, he meets "O'Toole" who asks him if he has seen his other half. Without thinking, he tells him it's by the door, O'Pat moves out of frame, and then it registers with Porky that he is in the presence of two leprechauns. Terrified, he hides in the bed, which is a trap door. The bed closes into the wall and Porky is dropped down a winding shaft until he lands in a witness chair in a leprechaun courtroom ("The Leprechaun Court of Shaughnessy Township, County of Rourke O'Houlihan"). There the leprechauns charge and convict him of trying to steal the pot of gold (despite having no substantial evidence against him); they sentence him to the wearing of the Green Shoes.

At first, Porky appreciates them as nice shoes, but soon he realizes that they are cursed, as his feet begin a frantic Irish jig which makes O’Pat and O’Mike laugh at him. The shoes will not stop dancing; even when he removes them, they chase him and return themselves to his feet. He is "danced" through an Irish dreamscape—reminsicent of the 15-minute ballet montage from the 1948 Powell & Pressburger classic The Red Shoes—until he falls in a boiling pot of gold. At this point, he wakes up, in a puddle of water, on the spot where he fell after being hit by the mace. "O'Toole" is standing over him with an empty bucket, implying he has dumped water over Porky to revive him. Porky screams, remembering that "O'Toole" is actually the two leprechauns, and leaps up to one of the posts that had been holding the mace. The caretaker tries to convince Porky that nothing has been amiss; Porky, frightened and disoriented, grabs his bags and runs away from the castle and into the distance stating he's late for an appointment with his psychologist. "O'Toole" watches him run, smoking his upside-down pipe, and sporting a mischievous smile, shakes hands with himself (a hand that emerges from his trousers, clearly O'Mike) over a shamrock-shaped iris out.

Production notes
The Wearing of the Grin was the final cartoon featuring Porky Pig as the only major recurring character. Porky had been Warner Bros. animation's first major star until he had been supplanted first by Daffy Duck (a phenomenon that was foreshadowed in film form in Friz Freleng’s You Ought to Be in Pictures), and later by Bugs Bunny. As this had progressed, Porky starred in fewer solo cartoons. All of Porky's subsequent appearances in the classic era would be with other characters such as Daffy or the non-speaking, house cat version of Sylvester.

The title refers to The Wearing of the Green, an old Irish ballad, while the green shoes themselves are borrowed from the 1845 Hans Christian Andersen fable "The Red Shoes" (and the 1948 film based on it) about a pair of ballet shoes that never let their wearer stop dancing. The title was parodied, also as "The Wearing of the Grin", in the Bugs Bunny cartoon What's Up, Doc?, where Bugs reveals that being in the play's chorus was his first gig as an "actor."

This is one of five Warner Bros. cartoons that had music scores provided by Eugene Poddany in the early 1950s, as the studio's regular musical director, Carl Stalling, was recovering from a brain injury during the cartoon's production. Milt Franklyn was also credited for orchestrations.

Other appearances
 "The Wearing of the Grin" is the name of one of the Broadway shows featuring Bugs Bunny as one of the "Boys in the Chorus" in What's Up Doc?
 The Leprechauns from the cartoon can later be spotted during the basketball game in the bleachers in Space Jam.
 The Leprechauns make their return in the SNES game of Porky Pig's Haunted Holiday.

Home media
The Wearing of the Grin is available on the Looney Tunes Golden Collection: Volume 1 DVD box-set, supplemented with an audio commentary by animation historian Michael Barrier.

See also
 Looney Tunes
 Looney Tunes and Merrie Melodies filmography (1950–1959)
 The Red Shoes (fairy tale)

References

External links
 

1951 films
1951 animated films
1951 short films
Looney Tunes shorts
Films based on works by Hans Christian Andersen
Short films directed by Chuck Jones
Porky Pig films
Films set in Ireland
Leprechaun films
1950s Warner Bros. animated short films
Animated films about animals
Works based on The Red Shoes (fairy tale)
Animated films based on Celtic mythology
Films based on fairy tales
Films with screenplays by Michael Maltese
Films scored by Milt Franklyn
Films scored by Eugene Poddany
Films set in castles
1950s English-language films